J Absolom of 88 Brisbane Street, Launceston, Tasmania, sold at least one motorcycle under his own name around 1915.

References

Motorcycle manufacturers of Australia
Motorcycles introduced in the 1910s
Motorcycles of Australia